Ayacucho is a department and region of Peru, located in the south-central Andes of the country. Its capital is the city of Ayacucho. The region was one of the hardest hit in the 1980s during the guerrilla war waged by Shining Path known as the internal conflict in Peru.

A referendum was held on 30 October 2005, in order to decide whether the department would merge with the departments of Ica and Huancavelica to form the new Ica-Ayacucho-Huancavelica Region, as part of the decentralization process in Peru. The proposal failed and no merger was carried out.

Political division

The department  is divided into 11 provinces (singular: provincia), which are composed of 111 districts (distritos, singular: distrito).

Provinces
The provinces, with their capitals in parenthesis, are:

 Cangallo (Cangallo)
 Huamanga (Ayacucho)
 Huanca Sancos (Huanca Sancos)
 Huanta (Huanta)
 La Mar (San Miguel)
 Lucanas (Puquio)
 Parinacochas (Coracora)
 Paucar del Sara Sara (Pausa)
 Sucre (Querobamba)
 Víctor Fajardo (Huancapi)
 Vilcas Huamán (Vilcas Huamán)

Demographics

Languages 
According to the 2007 Peru Census, the language learnt first by most of the residents was Quechua (63.05%) followed by Spanish (36.57%). The Quechua variety spoken in Ayacucho is Chanka Quechua. The following table shows the results concerning the language learnt first in the department by province:

Gallery

References

External links

 Ayacucho Regional Government official website

Ayacucho